Daily Post or The Daily Post may refer to the following newspapers:

India
 Daily Post India, founded in 2011

Nigeria
 Daily Post (Nigeria), founded in 2015

South Pacific
 Fiji's Daily Post (1987–2010)
 Guam Daily Post, founded in 2004
 Daily Post (Hobart) (1908–1918)
 The Daily Post (New Zealand), founded in 1885
 Vanuatu Daily Post, founded in 1993

United Kingdom
 South Wales Daily Post, former name of the South Wales Evening Post, Swansea, Wales
 Daily Post (London newspaper), founded in 1719
 Liverpool Daily Post (1855–2013)
 Daily Post (North Wales), split off from the Liverpool Daily Post in 2003
 Birmingham Daily Post, founded in 1857 (now the Birmingham Post)

United States
 Bay Daily Post, formerly the San Francisco Daily, a free newspaper founded in 2006
 Gwinnett Daily Post, published in Gwinnett County, Georgia since 1995
 Palo Alto Daily Post

See also
 The Post (disambiguation)